The first season of Will & Grace premiered on September 21, 1998, and concluded on May 13, 1999. It consisted of 22 episodes.

Cast and characters

Main cast 
 Eric McCormack as Will Truman
 Debra Messing as Grace Adler
 Megan Mullally as Karen Walker
 Sean Hayes as Jack McFarland
 Gary Grubbs as Harlin Polk

Recurring cast 
 Shelley Morrison as Rosario Salazar
 Tom Gallop as Rob
 Leigh-Allyn Baker as Ellen

Special guest stars 
 Rudy Galindo as himself
 Debbie Reynolds as Bobbi Adler
 Molly Shannon as Val Bassett

Guest stars 
 Beth Lapides as Ione
 Julian McMahon as Guy in Elevator
 Wendie Jo Sperber as April
 Raphael Sbarge as Alex
 John Slattery as Sam Truman
 David Sutcliffe as Campbell
 Miguel Ferrer as Nathan Berry
 Tom Verica as Danny

Episodes

References

1
1998 American television seasons
1999 American television seasons
Television episodes directed by James Burrows